Kevin Valdez (born May 14, 1999) is an American actor known for his debut role as Louie King, in the Apple TV+ web television series Little Voice (2020). Diagnosed at 18 months, Kevin Valdez, like his character Louie, has autism.

Background 
Valdez grew up in Ripon, California. He had an interest in acting since elementary school. At age 14, Valdez landed his first acting role in the Cornerstone Community Church production of Cinderella Kids and later appearing in productions of Seussical Jr. and The Lion, the Witch and the Wardrobe. Attending Ripon High School, he was active in the drama club and an avid journalist for the school paper, The Smoke Signal.

Filmography

Television

References

External links
 Official Twitter

1999 births
Living people
Actors with autism